Engineering College Nowgong or Nowgong Engineering College (NEC) is a government autonomous engineering college established by government of Madhya Pradesh in 2012. Currently it is functioning in its temporary campus in Government Polytechnic college Nowgong but is expected to shift into its   newly built 200 acre campus in the upcoming years.
Initially it offered mechanical engineering and civil engineering but number of courses will increase with the passage of time.
It is among the top engineering colleges of the state.

Workshops
The college holds workshops every year in the month of September. Students from every department gets benefited via experience they gets during such events.

HISTORY
Nowgong Engineering College (NEC) Nowgong was established in the year 2012 by the government of Madhya Pradesh and was declared as autonomous institution in the same year. It is one of the five government autonomous engineering colleges in Madhya Pradesh.

CAMPUS
It has a vast campus spread over an area of 200 acres on NH 75. Which is by far one of the largest college campus in the state of Madhya Pradesh. The campus is built on the sides of NH 75, further it has Naura Hills which adds beauty to its campus.

Engineering colleges in Madhya Pradesh